The Lac du Flambeau Band of Lake Superior Chippewa (called Waaswaaganing in Ojibwe) is a federally recognized Ojibwa Native American tribe. It had 3,415 enrolled members as of 2010. The Lac du Flambeau Indian Reservation lies mostly in the Town of Lac du Flambeau in south-western Vilas County, and in the Town of Sherman in south-eastern Iron County in the U.S. state of Wisconsin. Its major settlement is the unincorporated Lac du Flambeau, which had a population of 1,845 persons. 

Located at Waaswaagani-zaaga'igan (French: Lac du Flambeau; English: Torch Lake), the reservation of the Lac du Flambeau Band was established under the Treaty of 1854. The band had occupied this area since 1745, when it defeated the Sioux in the last battle between the peoples, driving them to the west. The Ojibwe had gradually migrated over centuries from the Atlantic coast.

With renewed self-government under a written constitution in the 20th century, the Lac du Flambeau Band have established enterprises to build on their natural resources.

Tribal settlement

The ancestors of the Lac du Flambeau Band and other bands moved west from the Michigan area in the 17th century into the interior of Wisconsin west and south of Lake Superior. They were called the Waaswaaganininiwag (the "Torch Lake Men"). French fur traders named the band and lake for the Ojibwe practice of catching fish at night on the lake by torchlight.

According to the Lac du Flambeau Band, they settled permanently in the area in 1745, led by their Chief Keeshkemun. He helped them defeat the Sioux (Dakota) that year, who had long occupied this area. The last battle between them and these Chippewa took place on Strawberry Island in the lake.

The larger competition for resources between the Dakota and the Lake Superior Chippewa had begun in 1737 and continued for nearly 100 years before the Chippewa pushed out the Dakota and the Fox tribes from the Wisconsin interior. 
 
The Waaswaaganininiwag constituted the eastern group of the Biitan-akiing-enabijig (Border Sitters), a sub-Nation of the Gichigamiwininiwag (the Lake Superior Men, also known as Lake Superior Chippewa). Others members of the eastern Biitan-akiing-enabijig included bands located on Pelican Lake, Lac Vieux Desert, Turtle Portage, Trout Lake and Wisconsin River.

For centuries, the lake Waaswaagani-zaaga'igan served as the trade and transportation hub for Native Americans and later colonial traders, as it connected the waterways between Lake Superior (via the Montreal River) and the Wisconsin and Flambeau rivers. Traders used the lake and rivers to pass back and forth through their far-flung network. They also had to use the Flambeau Trail to portage from Lake Superior to the Lac du Flambeau District. The trail was 45 miles long, with 120 "pauses" created along the path to give portagers a break, an indication of the rough country.

As part of the Lake Superior Chippewa and signatories to the 1854 Treaty of La Pointe, the bands at Pelican Lake, Turtle Portage, Trout Lake and Wisconsin River were consolidated into the Lac du Flambeau Band (Waaswaaganing in Ojibwe). As signatories to the Treaty of St. Peters of 1837, and the Treaties of La Pointe of 1842 and 1854, members of the Lac du Flambeau Band enjoy the traditional hunting, fishing and gathering practices guaranteed in these treaties.

Like other tribes, the band had much of it land allotted to individual households under the Dawes Act of the early 20th century, intended to encourage assimilation to European-American style property holding and farming. This led to the loss of some of its lands, including Strawberry Island, which was sold to a non-Native family in 1910.

Strawberry Island
The Lac du Flambeau Band consider Strawberry Island sacred, and call it "the place of the little people" or spirits according to tribal tradition. They consider it the heart of their reservation. Listed in 1978 on the National Register of Historic Places, it is described as "one of the most important archeological sites in northern Wisconsin" by Robert Birmingham, as state archeologist in 1995. It has remained undeveloped since the 18th century.

In 1745, the island was the last battle site between these Ojibwe and the Lakota Sioux. The band believes that warriors were buried there. In 1966, an archaeological survey by a professor at Beloit College revealed that the island has human remains, and layers of artifacts dating to 200 BC. As the island was used by indigenous cultures for more than 2,000 years, the tribe wants to keep it undeveloped for its historical, cultural and spiritual significance.

In the 20th century under the Dawes Act, the island was assigned to a tribal member as part of the allotment of tribal lands to individual households, a federal attempt to force assimilation. When he died, a non-Native family bought the island in 1910, using it for years for summer camping vacations. From the 1990s onward, the tribe tried to buy the island. As lakefront property is valuable, the family and tribe were unable to agree on a price for the 26-acre island, which has 4700 feet of lakefront. The Trust for Public Land has assisted the tribe.

The owners did not concede that the island may never be developed, although one development proposal was stopped in 1996 by a building permit challenge. The tribe owns all the land surrounding the island and controlled access to it. An appeals court in 2003 affirmed the denial of the building permit, with the judge ruling that, as the island was within the boundaries of the tribe's reservation, the band should determine its future. The case continued, as the tribe and owners sought mediation but were still unable to agree on a price.

In 2008, Bonnie Mills-Rush, manager of the LLC that owns the island, assigned a lease and control to Bill Poupart, a member of the Lac du Flambeau Band. While at time the tribe did not own the land, Poupart was given authority to determine its use and agreed on its sacred nature.

On December 23, 2013, the tribe purchased the island from the Mills family for $250,000. The tribe held a "Strawberry Island Closing and Drum Ceremony" at the William Wildcat Sr. Community Center on December 30, 2013, in celebration of the acquisition. The deed was signed at the ceremony, bringing to an end years of uncertainty and contention surrounding the island.

Government
In the 20th century, the tribe re-established its own government under a written constitution. It elects a council and president. The council establishes membership rules for the tribe, and provides government services to the reservation. It has developed a number of businesses: LDF Industries (pallet manufacturing), Ojibwa Mall, Campground, Fish Hatchery, gas station, and cigarettes and tobacco shop. Together with the resort described below, it is working to develop enterprises that preserve and build on the natural resources of the reservation.

The tribe established the Lake of the Torches Economic Development Corporation to develop and operate the Lake of the Torches resort and casino, intended to generate revenue and also provide employment to members of the tribe. When the Casino did not yield expected profits, the tribe encountered repayment difficulties with the creditors it had engaged to help finance the casino. A dispute with the Casino's creditors ensued, as they tried to take control of its assets by receivership, under the terms of the bond indenture. When the case went to court, "the district court denied the motion to appoint a receiver and dismissed the lawsuit on the grounds that the trust indenture was a "management contract" under the IGRA [Indian Gaming Regulatory Act] which lacked the required approval of the NIGC Chairman." The creditors appealed the decision.

In Wells Fargo Bank, N.A. v. Lake of the Torches Economic Development Corporation (2011), the United States Court of Appeals for the Seventh Circuit agreed that the bond indenture constituted a management contract and was invalid. It contained provisions that permitted lenders to influence the management of a tribal casino, for instance, preventing the tribe from changing operating officials without bondholder approval, and others that encroached on tribal authority, without having gained required approval of the indenture/contract by the National Indian Gaming Commission. The provisions together gave a "great deal of authority in an entity other than the tribe to control the Casino's operations," which was not in keeping with the law on Indian gaming. The Seventh Circuit decision requested additional guidance from the United States Congress and /or the National Indian Gaming Commission regarding the "rules of the road" for tribal casino financing.

Reservation demographics
As of the census of 2020, the population of the Lac du Flambeau Reservation was 3,518.

The Lac du Flambeau Reservation has a significant non-native population due in part to the allotment and sale of reservation lands in the early twentieth century. The racial makeup of the reservation in 2020 was 58.6% Native American, 37.3% White, 0.2% Black or African American, 0.3% from other races, and 3.5% from two or more races. Ethnically, the population was 2.7% Hispanic or Latino of any race.

According  to the American Community Survey estimates for 2016-2020, the median income for a household in the reservation was $41,095, and the median income for a family was $51,538. Male full-time workers had a median income of $42,155 versus $27,563 for female workers. The per capita income for the reservation was $26,048. About 16.9% of families and 20.6% of the population were below the poverty line, including 29.5% of those under age 18 and 8.4% of those age 65 or over. Of the population age 25 and over, 89.8% were high school graduates or higher and 24.5% had a bachelor's degree or higher.

Notable members 
 Thomas St. Germaine (1885–1947), American football player

References
Notes

Bibliography
Lac du Flambeau Reservation, Wisconsin United States Census Bureau
Stephanie Hor-Chen, "Troubled Domestic Sovereign Debt: What Every Commercial Professional Should Know", National Law Review
Jonathan Wry, "Lake of Torches Appellate Decision: 'Management Contracts' Are Still a Burning Issue in Tribal Gaming Financings", National Law Review

Further reading
Loew, Patty, 2001. Indian Nations of Wisconsin: Histories of Endurance and Renewal, Madison: Wisconsin Historical Society Press

External links
Lac du Flambeau Band of Lake Superior Chippewa, Official website
Lac du Flambeau Chamber of Commerce, town website
Tribal newspaper
Great Lakes Indian Fish & Wildlife Commission, representing eleven Ojibwe tribes with reserved hunting and fishing rights
James K. Bokern, History and the Primary Canoe Routes of the Six Bands of Chippewa from the Lac Du Flambeau District, Unpublished Masters Thesis, 1987, prepared under supervision at University of Wisconsin-Stevens Point
Wiigwaasi-Jiimaan: These Canoes Carry Culture—Short documentary featuring the building of an Anishinaabe-Ojibwe birchbark canoe in Wisconsin.
 With a Land Dispute Deadlocked, a Wisconsin Tribe Blockades Streets - New York Times article about a property dispute between the Town of Lac du Flambeau and the Lac du Flambeau Band of Lake Superior Chippewa

Ojibwe in the United States
Ojibwe governments
Native American tribes in Wisconsin
Native American history of Wisconsin
Populated places in Iron County, Wisconsin
Populated places in Vilas County, Wisconsin
Populated places in Price County, Wisconsin